KQBB (100.5 FM, Real Country Q100) is a radio station broadcasting a Classic Country music format. Licensed to Center, Texas, United States, the station serves the Lufkin-Nacogdoches area.  The station is currently owned by Center Broadcasting Company and features programming from Cumulus Broadcasting. The station has obtained a construction permit from the FCC for a power increase to 8,700 watts.

History
The station was assigned the call letters KDET-FM on 1991-12-27.  On 2001-08-15, the station changed its call sign to the current KQBB.

References

External links
 

QBB
Radio stations established in 1991
1991 establishments in Texas